Haplogroup T-L206, also known as haplogroup T1, is a human Y-chromosome DNA haplogroup. The SNP that defines the T1 clade is L206. The haplogroup is one of two primary branches of T (T-M184), the other subclade being T2 (T-PH110).

T1 is the most common descendant of the T-M184 haplogroup, being the lineage of more than 95% of all T-M184 members in Africa and Eurasia (as well as countries to which those populations have migrated in the modern era, in the Americas and Australasia).  T1 lineages are now found at high frequencies among northern Somali clans. It is hypothesized that T1* (if not some of its subclades) originated in Western Asia, and spread into Europe and North Africa with the Pre-Pottery Neolithic B culture (PPNB).

The basal clade T1* is rare, but has been found in at least three males from widely separated regions: a Berber from Tunisia, a Syrian, and a Macedonian.

T-L206's sole primary branch, T1a (M70), is believed to have originated about 15,900 – 23,900 BP, in the Levant. It appears that a number of individuals bearing T-M70 later migrated south to Africa.

Structure

T1 (L206, L490) Found in Syria.
T1a (M70/Page46/PF5662, PAGES78) Found in Early Neolithic skeleton found in Karsdorf, Germany, 7200 years old. Also in Iran, Iraq, Saudi Arabia, Ossetia, England, Italy and Portugal.
T1a1 (L162/Page21, L299, L453/PF5617, L454) Found on Eivissa, northern Anatolia and Germany.
T1a1a (L208/Page2, L905) Mostly found in Upper Egypt, Horn of Africa, western Europe, eastern Anatolia, Iran and the Arabian Peninsula. Some spots in western Morocco, Sahrawis and Canarias.
T1a1a1 (P77,CTS8512) Mostly found in Middle East, Western Europe and Ashkenazi Jews.
T1a1a2 (P321) Found in Syria and Ashkenazi Jews.
T1a1a2a (P317) Found in Syria, Italian Jews and Ashkenazi Jews.
T1a2 (L131) Mostly found in northern Europe, eastern Europe, southeastern Europe and Anatolia. Also found in Xinjiang, Lemba, Tunisia, south and east Iberian Peninsula.
T1a2a (P322, P328) Found in Scandinavia, Denmark, Germany and Netherlands. Some spots in Yemenite Jews and Palestine(P327).
T1a2b (L446) Found in Northwest Europe and eastern Alps.
T1a3 (L1255) Found in Kuwait.

Subclade distribution

T1* (T-L206*) 
This lineage could have arrived in the Levant through the PPNB expansion from northeastern Anatolia.

T1a (M70)

T1a1 (L162; xL208) 
T1a1 formed 17,400-14,600 BP, is the largest lineage downstream from T1a-M70 and became widespread across Eurasia and Africa before the modern era.

This extremely rare subclade has been found in Ibizan (Eivissan) islanders and Pontic Greeks from Giresun. The first Y-STR haplotype belonging to this lineage appeared in the paper of Tomas et al in 2006 among a sample of Eivissan individuals but is not until August 2009 when the first T1a1-L162(xL208) individual was reported in a 23andMe customer of Pontic Greek background and Metaxopoulos surname, thanks to the public Adriano Squecco's Y-Chromosome Genome Comparison Project.

Pontic Greeks from Giresun descend from Sinope colonists and Sinope was colonised by Ionians from Miletus. Is interesting to note that there exist an Ionian colony known as Pityussa just like the known Greek name for Eivissa Pityuses. In Eivissa, where is found the famous bust of Demeter that have been confused with the punic Tanit for decades, is known the cult to Demeter. The bust belonging to Demeter have been analysed and is found to contains black particles of volcanic sand origin from the Etna, is thought to be made in Sicily with red clays typical of the eastern Trinacria, which was colonized by the Ionians. The Ionians could be arrived to Eivissa c.2700 YBP. This lineage could be an Ionian marker.
T1a1 formed 17,400-14,600 BP, is the largest lineage downstream from T1a-M70 and became widespread across Eurasia and Africa before the modern era.

This extremely rare subclade has been found in Ibizan (Eivissan) islanders and Pontic Greeks from Giresun. The first Y-STR haplotype belonging to this lineage appeared in the paper of Tomas et al in 2006 among a sample of Eivissan individuals but is not until August 2009 when the first T1a1-L162(xL208) individual was reported in a 23andMe customer of Pontic Greek background and Metaxopoulos surname, thanks to the public Adriano Squecco's Y-Chromosome Genome Comparison Project.

Pontic Greeks from Giresun descend from Sinope colonists and Sinope was colonised by Ionians from Miletus. Is interesting to note that there exist an Ionian colony known as Pityussa just like the known Greek name for Eivissa Pityuses. In Eivissa, where is found the famous bust of Demeter that have been confused with the punic Tanit for decades, is known the cult to Demeter. The bust belonging to Demeter have been analysed and is found to contains black particles of volcanic sand origin from the Etna, is thought to be made in Sicily with red clays typical of the eastern Trinacria, which was colonized by the Ionians. The Ionians could be arrived to Eivissa c.2700 YBP. This lineage could be an Ionian marker.

T1a1a (L208)

This lineage, formed 14,200-11,000 BP, is the largest branch downstream T1a1-L162. First discovered and reported in August 2009 in a 23andMe customer of Iberian ancestry that participated in the public Squecco's Y-Chromosome Genome Comparison Project and appearing there as "Avilés" and as "AlpAstur" in 23andMe. Named as "L208" at November 2009.

T1a1a1a1b1a1 (Y3782; xY3836)

T1a1a1a1b1a1a (Y3836)

This lineage is mostly found among individuals from the Iberian Peninsula, where is found their highest diversity. The first Y-STR haplotype of this lineage, characterized by DYS437=13, was found in the public FTDNA Y-DNA Haplogroup T project, appearing there at April 2009 as kit E8011. However, is not until June 2014 when the Y-SNP Y3836 was discovered in the public YFULL project among two of their participants of Iberian ancestry, appearing there as YF01637 and YF01665.

Geographical distribution

Europe 

Cretan Greeks from Lasithi possess Haplogroup T, almost certainly T1a (M70), at a level of 18% (9/50).

Unconfirmed but probable T-M70+ : 14% (3/23) of Russians in Yaroslavl, 12.5% (3/24) of Italians in Matera, 10.3% (3/29) of Italians in Avezzano, 10% (3/30) of Tyroleans in Nonstal, 10% (2/20) of Italians in Pescara, 8.7% (4/46) of Italians in Benevento, 7.8% (4/51) of Italians in South Latium, 7.4% (2/27) of Italians in Paola, 7.3% (11/150) of Italians in Central-South Italy, 7.1% (8/113) of Serbs in Serbia, 4.7% (2/42) of Aromanians in Romania, 3.7% (3/82) of Italians in Biella, 3.7% (1/27) of Andalusians in Córdoba, 3.3% (2/60) of Leoneses in León, 3.2% (1/31) of Italians in Postua, 3.2% (1/31) of Italians in Cavaglià, 3.1% (3/97) of Calabrians in Reggio Calabria, 2.8% (1/36) of Russians in Ryazan Oblast, 2.8% (2/72) of Italians in South Apulia, 2.7% (1/37) of Calabrians in Cosenza, 2.6% (3/114) of Serbs in Belgrade, 2.5% (1/40) of Russians in Pskov, 2.4% (1/42) of Russians in Kaluga, 2.2% (2/89) of Transylvanians in Miercurea Ciuc, 2.2% (2/92) of Italians in Trino Vercellese, 1.9% (2/104) of Italians in Brescia, 1.9% (2/104) of Romanians in Romania, 1.7% (4/237) of Serbs and Montenegrins in Serbia and Montenegro, 1.7% (1/59) of Italians in Marche, 1.7% (1/59) of Calabrians in Catanzaro, 1.6% (3/183) of Greeks in Northern Greece, 1.3% (2/150) of Swiss Germans in Zürich Area, 1.3% (1/79) of Italians in South Tuscany and North Latium, 1.1% (1/92) of Dutch in Leiden, 0.5% (1/185) of Serbs in Novi Sad (Vojvodina), 0.5% (1/186) of Polish in Podlasie

Middle East & Caucasus 

Unconfirmed but probable T-M70+ : 28% (7/25) of Lezginians in Dagestan, 21.7% (5/23) of Ossetians in Zamankul, 14% (7/50) of Iranians in Isfahan, 13% (3/23) of Ossetians in Zil'ga, 12.6% (11/87) of Kurmanji Kurds in Eastern Turkey, 11.8% (2/17) of Palestinian Arabs in Palestine, 8.3% (1/12) of Iranians in Shiraz, 8.3% (2/24) of Ossetians in Alagir, 8% (2/25) of Kurmanji Kurds in Georgia, 7.5% (6/80) of Iranians in Tehran, 7.4% (10/135) of Palestinian Arabs in Israeli Village, 7% (10/143) of Palestinian Arabs in Israel and Palestine, 5% (1/19) of Chechens in Chechenia, 4.2% (3/72) of Azerbaijanians in Azerbaijan, 4.1% (2/48) of Iranians in Isfahan, 4% (4/100) of Armenians in Armenia, 4% (1/24) of Bedouins in Israel and 2.6% (1/39) of Turks in Ankara.

North & East Asia 
Barghut Mongolians from |different localities of Hulun Buir Aimak have T1a (M70) at a level of 1.3% (1/76). In the 12–13th centuries, the Barga (Barghuts) Mongols appeared as tribes near Lake Baikal, named Bargujin.

Unconfirmed but probable T-M70+: 2% (4/204) of Hui in Liaoning province, and 0.9% (1/113) of Bidayuh in Sarawak.

South Asia 
Haplogroup T1a-M70 in South Asia is considered to be of West Eurasian origin.

The Garo people of Tangail District appear to possess T-P77 (T1a1a1b2b2b1a) at a rate of 0.8% (1/120).||Likely +

Unconfirmed but probable T-M70+ : 56.6% (30/53) of Kunabhis in Uttar Kannada, 32.5% (13/40) of Kammas in Andhra Pradesh, 26.8% (11/41) of Brahmins in Visakhapatnam, 25% (1/4) of Kattunaiken in South India, 22.4% (11/49) of Telugus in Andhra Pradesh, 20% (1/5) of Ansari in South Asia, (2/20) of Poroja in Andhra Pradesh, 9.8% (5/51) of Kashmiri Pandits in Kashmir, 8.2% (4/49) of Gujars in Kashmir, 7.7% (1/13) of Siddis (migrants from Ethiopia) in Andhra Pradesh, 5.5% (3/55) of Adi in Northeast India, 5.5% (7/128) of Pardhans in Adilabad, 5.3% (2/38) of Brahmins in Bihar, 4.3% (1/23) of Bagata in Andhra Pradesh, 4.2% (1/24) of Valmiki in Andhra Pradesh, (1/32) of Brahmins in Maharashtra, 3.1% (2/64) of Brahmins in Gujarat, 2.9% (1/35) of Rajput in Uttar Pradesh, 2.3% (1/44) of Brahmins in Peruru, and 1.7% (1/59) of Manghi in Maharashtra.

Also in Desasth-Brahmins in Maharashtra (1/19 or 5.3%) and Chitpavan-Brahmins in Konkan (1/21 or 4.8%), Chitpavan-Brahmins in Konkan (2/66 or 3%).

Africa

Ancient DNA

'Ain Ghazal, 9,573 BP

Haplogroup T is found among the later Middle Pre-Pottery Neolithic B (MPPNB) inhabitants from the 'Ain Ghazal archaeological site (in modern Jordan). It was not found among the early and middle MPPNB populations. It is thought that the Pre-Pottery Neolithic B population is mostly composed of two different populations: members of early Natufian civilisation and a population resulting from immigration from the north, i.e. north-eastern Anatolia. However, Natufians have been found to belong mostly to the E1b1b1b2 lineage – which is found among 60% of the whole PPNB population and 75% of the 'Ain Ghazal population, being present in all three MPPNB stages. 

Later MPPNB populations in the Southern Levant were already witnessing severe changes in climate that would have been exacerbated by large population demands on local resources. Beginning at 8.9 cal ka BP we see a significant decrease in population in highland Jordan, ultimately leading to the complete abandonment of almost all central settlements in this region.

The 9th millennium Pre-Pottery Neolithic B (PPNB) period in the Levant represents a major transformation in prehistoric lifeways from small bands of mobile hunter–gatherers to large settled farming and herding villages in the Mediterranean zone, the process having been initiated some 2–3 millennia earlier.

'Ain Ghazal (" Spring of the Gazelles") is situated in a relatively rich environmental setting immediately adjacent to the Wadi Zarqa, the longest drainage system in highland Jordan. It is located at an elevation of about 720m within the ecotone between the oak-park woodland to the west and the open steppe-desert to the east.

Evidence recovered from the excavations suggests that much of the surrounding countryside was forested and offered the inhabitants a wide variety of economic resources. Arable land is plentiful within the site's immediate environs. These variables are atypical of many major neolithic sites in the Near East, several of which are located in marginal environments. Yet despite its apparent richness, the area of 'Ain Ghazal is climatically and environmentally sensitive because of its proximity throughout the Holocene to the fluctuating steppe-forest border.

The Ain Ghazal settlement first appear in the MPPNB and is split into two MPPNB phases. Phase 1 starts 10300 yBP and ends 9950 yBP, phase 2 ends 9550 yBP.

The estimated population of the MPPNB site from ‘Ain Ghazal is of 259-1,349 individuals with an area of 3.01-4.7 ha. Is argued that at its founding at the commencement of the MPPNB ‘Ain Ghazal was likely 2 ha in size and grew to 5 ha by the end of the MPPNB. At this point in time their estimated population was 600-750 people or 125-150 people per hectare.

Notable members

Elite endurance runners
Possible patterns between Y-chromosome and elite endurance runners were studied in an attempt to find a genetic explanation to the Ethiopian endurance running success. Given the superiority of East African athletes in international distance running over the past four decades, it has been speculated that they are genetically advantaged. Elite marathon runners from Ethiopia were analysed for K*(xP) which according to the previously published Ethiopian studies is attributable to the haplogroup T

According to further studies, T1a1a* (L208) was found to be proportionately more frequent in the elite marathon runners sample than in the control samples than any other haplogroup, therefore this y-chromosome could play a significant role in determining Ethiopian endurance running success. Haplogroup T1a1a* was found in 14% of the elite marathon runners sample of whom 43% of this sample are from Arsi province. In addition, haplogroup T1a1a* was found in only 4% of the Ethiopian control sample and only 1% of the Arsi province control sample. T1a1a* is positively associated with aspects of endurance running, whereas E1b1b1 (old E3b1) is negatively associated.

Thomas Jefferson

A notable member of the T-M184 haplogroup is the third US President, Thomas Jefferson. He reportedly belongs to a subclade of T-M184 which is most commonly found in both the Iberian Peninsula (e.g. Spain) and Egypt. His most distant known ancestor is Samuel Jeffreason , born 11 October 1607 at Pettistree, Suffolk, England, although there is also a widespread belief that the President had Welsh ancestry. While all subclades of T-M184 are rare in Britain, some British males with the surname Jefferson have also reportedly been found to carry T-M184, reinforcing the idea that Thomas Jefferson's immediate paternal ancestry was British and may originate in Sephardic (Spanish) Jewish populations, who have their ultimate origins in the Middle East. 
 
There was controversy for almost two centuries regarding allegations that Thomas Jefferson had fathered the children of his slave Sally Hemings. An oral tradition in the Hemings family and other historical evidence was countered in the early 19th century by some Jefferson's grandchildren, who asserted that a son of Thomas Jefferson's sister, by the name of  Carr, had been the father of Hemings' children. However, a 1998 study of Jefferson male-line DNA found that it matched that of a descendant of Sally Hemings' youngest son, Eston Hemings. Most historians now believe that Jefferson had a relationship  with Hemings for 38 years, and probably fathered her six known children, four of whom lived to adulthood. In addition, the testing conclusively disproved any connection between the Hemings descendant and the Carr male line.

Subclades

Tree

Phylogenetic history

Prior to 2002, there were in academic literature at least seven naming systems for the Y-Chromosome Phylogenetic tree. This led to considerable confusion. In 2002, the major research groups came together and formed the Y-Chromosome Consortium (YCC). They published a joint paper that created a single new tree that all agreed to use. Later, a group of citizen scientists with an interest in population genetics and genetic genealogy formed a working group to create an amateur tree aiming at being above all timely. The table below brings together all of these works at the point of the landmark 2002 YCC Tree. This allows a researcher reviewing older published literature to quickly move between nomenclatures.

Original research publications
The following research teams per their publications were represented in the creation of the YCC Tree.

α  and 

β 

γ 

δ 

ε 

ζ 

η

Y-DNA backbone tree

References

Original research

Other works cited

Sources for conversion tables

External links 
 The Y-DNA Haplogroup T Project
 YFull T YTree
 T1a-M70 skeleton, Germany I0795_390K
 T1a-M70 skeleton, Germany I0795_1240K
 T1a-M70 skeleton, Germany I0797_1240K
 Settlement Burials at the Karsdorf LBK Site, Saxony-Anhalt, Germany
 Map of the 7100ybp T1a settlement of Karsdorf
 Video: Karsdorf's adjacent pagan structure for tribal rituals
 Video: Tribal culture contemporaneous to T1a and their adjacent pagan structure
 The Digital Archaeological Atlas of the 'Ain Ghazal settlement
 C14 radiocarbon CONTEXT database

T-L206